Anne Green (1891–1979) was an American author and translator.

Ann(e) Green(e) may also refer to:

Ann Green (died 1518), buried at Church of St Peter, Alstonefield with oldest legible gravestone in England
Anne Greene ( 1628–1659), English servant accused of infanticide
Anne Green (Chief Islander) (born 1952), politician from Tristan da Cunha
Anne Green (scientist), Australian physician and astronomer
Anne Green (swimming), Australian swimming coach
Anne Catherine Hoof Green ( 1720–1775), printer and publisher
Anne Dunkin Greene ( 1885–1939), American socialite
Ann Larsson (athlete) or Ann Larsson Green (born 1955), Swedish sprinter

See also
Anna Green (disambiguation)
Anne-Marie Green (born 1971), American news anchor
Green (surname)